This is a list of current and former Roman Catholic churches in the Roman Catholic Diocese of Las Vegas.

Clark County

Lincoln County

Nye County

White Pine County

References

 
Las Vegas